Steve Hill was an American Christian clergyman and evangelist. He is best known as the evangelist who preached in what became known as the Brownsville Revival. It was a series of meetings at Brownsville Assembly of God in Pensacola, Florida that began on Father's Day, 1995 and continued for five years. In 2000, Hill moved to the Dallas/Fort Worth area in Texas to resume traveling evangelism. In 2003, he founded Heartland Family Church in the Las Colinas section of Irving, Texas, a suburb of Dallas.

Ministry and revival

Hill graduated from a two-year ministry training school run by Teen Challenge founder David Wilkerson. From there, he served on the staff with Outreach Ministries of Alabama, then as a youth pastor at several churches in Florida. In the mid-1980s, he and his wife became missionaries, holding crusades and planting churches in Argentina, Spain, and Belarus. Early in 1995, Hill went to London, England where a revival was happening at Holy Trinity Brompton Anglican Church.
 
The revival began on what is popularly known as the Pensacola Outpouring.  Some congregants at the service spoke of the presence of "a mighty wind" that blew through the church.  This account rapidly spread across the Pentecostal community, but gained little attention in the mainstream media.

Hill preached several revival services each week for the next five years

Death
Stephen Hill died on March 9, 2014, 
His son Ryan died in October 2014.

References

External links
Heartland Family Church (Hill's church)
Heartland School of Ministry (Hill's Ministry School)
ChristianWord.org interview with Steve Hill
Steve Hill School of Evangelism (Hill's School of Evangelism)

American Assemblies of God pastors
People from Ankara
People from Irving, Texas
2014 deaths
1954 births